Austin Graham Bagnall  (30 November 1912 – 16 April 1986) was a New Zealand librarian, bibliographer and historian. He was born in Auckland, New Zealand, on 30 November 1912.

In the 1978 Queen's Birthday Honours, Bagnall was appointed an Officer of the Order of the British Empire, for services to New Zealand literature and the library profession.

References

1912 births
1986 deaths
New Zealand librarians
20th-century New Zealand historians
People from Auckland
New Zealand Officers of the Order of the British Empire